Semper Floreat (Latin: "May it always flourish") is the student newspaper of the University of Queensland, in Brisbane, Australia. It has been published continuously by the University of Queensland Union (UQ Union) since 1932, when it began as a fortnightly newsletter of only a few pages, produced by one editor.

Recent History 
In 2014, Semper (as it is colloquially known) became a 48-page, monthly magazine that employs a full-time editor, deputy editor and 8 part-time editors The editors are elected annually by the student body. In 2017, Semper reduced its magazine publications to three for the year, and relaunched its website.

Semper occupied an important position in Brisbane's cultural and radical history, and has been closely connected with such cultural icons such as 'Time Off'. Semper editor, Alan Knight (1973), was a founding Director of 4ZZZ FM (1975).
A number of important Australian writers, critics, historians and social commentators have been associated with the newspaper including David Malouf (writer, poet), Joan Kerr (art and cultural historian, academic), Jack Carmody (Professor of Medicine, opera and theatre critic), Shane Porteous (actor), Alan Frost (historian), Graeme Rowlands (poet and critic), William Yang aka Willie Young (photographer), Peter McCawley (economist, senior civil servant, Asia specialist), Brian Toohey (economist, newspaper editor, political commentator), Michael O'Neill (political activist), Dan O'Neill (academic and political activist), Susan Geason (journalist, political adviser, writer), Lenore Taylor (Walkley-winning journalist, author, now editor of Guardian Australia), Julianne Schultz, John Birmingham, Clinton Walker and Humphrey McQueen. In 2005 its editors included Daniel and Sarah Spencer, who went on to form the influential underground rock band Blank Realm.

The University of Queensland Fryer Library holds the most complete collection of the newspaper and archival issues are available through UQ eSpace; copies are also held in the State Library of Queensland, the Queensland Parliamentary Library, and the National Library of Australia in Canberra. Archival issues are also available from UQ eSpace.

The first student magazine for the university was called Queensland University Magazine (later known as Galmahra). It continued to publish alongside Semper Floreat until the 1950s.

Editors (2020-2022) 
In 2020 UQ Union elections the Labor aligned ticket Rebuild successfully beat the LNP aligned Real and third party ticket Forward to win both Semper Floreat and the UQ Union executive.

Art of Shoplifting controversy
In 1995, Semper reprinted a controversial article from Rabelais Student Media, its La Trobe University counterpart, entitled 'The Art of Shoplifting' – one of seven student newspapers to do so. Although the Rabelais editors responsible for the original article were prosecuted for ignoring a ban on publication issued by the state's Chief Censor; the editors of the other seven newspapers were not targeted by the authorities. Charges against the Rabelais editors were later dropped.

A similar article appearing in the August 2022 edition of Semper, this time called ‘the Subtle Art of Shoplifting’, made headlines internationally. Its anonymous author rehashed some of the points made by the original article, as well as adding some modern techniques to circumvent the increasing sophistication and technological expansion of security. Australian networks such as Newscorp, Seven, Fairfax, and the ABC ultimately criticized the publication for its promotion of criminal behaviour.

See also
 University of Queensland Union (UQU)
University of Queensland

References

External links
Complete digitised collection of Semper Floreat in UQ eSpace, The University of Queensland Library
Semper website
History of off-campus sale and distribution of Semper and Time Off link on Pandora website (archived version)

Student newspapers published in Australia
Publications established in 1932
University of Queensland